Costa Volpino is a comune in the province of Bergamo, in Lombardy, Italy.  Situated at the end of Valle Camonica, where the Oglio river enters the Lake Iseo, it is bounded by other communes of Lovere and Rogno.

References